The Noora Räty Award is an ice hockey trophy awarded to the Rookie of the Year of the Naisten Liiga (previously the Naisten SM-sarja), as selected by the Finnish Ice Hockey Association. Rookie of the Year was first awarded in the 2005–06 Naisten SM-sarja season and the first recipient was Espoo Blues Naiset rookie goaltender Noora Räty. Since her rookie season, Räty has established herself as a top goaltender  – considered by many to be the best active women’s goaltender in the world. The Naisten SM-sarja Rookie of the Year award was named after Räty in the 2010–11 season.

Fifteen players have received the award, four defencemen, ten forwards, and one goaltender. The current title holder is Anna-Kaisa Antti-Roiko of Oulun Kärpät Naiset and the Finnish national under-18 team, who was recognized for her play in the 2020–21 Naisten Liiga season.

Award winners 

Sources:

References 

Naisten Liiga (ice hockey) trophies and awards
Rookie player awards